Autoinflation is a minimally invasive procedure in which a nasal balloon is inserted into the nasopharynx, followed by the application of pressure to the sinus cavities by forcibly contracting the diaphragm against the closed nasal passageways. It can also be performed by manually pinching the nasal passages and closing the back of the pharynx, followed by forceful contraction of the diaphragm. It is not recommended in cases of bacterial, or suppurative, otitis media, but rather serous non-infectious cases, colloquially referred to as 'glue ear'.

References

External links

Otorhinolaryngology
Medical procedures
Otitis
Diseases of middle ear and mastoid
Audiology